Immortality, Inc. is a 1959 science fiction novel by American writer Robert Sheckley. It is also his first novel. A striking concept in the novel is its description of random killings of strangers by people who intend to die. The novel remains one of Sheckley's most popular and critically acclaimed. The serialised form (published under the title Time Killer in the magazine Galaxy Science Fiction) was nominated for the Hugo Award for Best Novel the same year it was released (1959). The novel has been released in 51 editions since Its initial publication, with the latest being released in 2014 as an e-book.

Premise and plot 
The novel starts with its protagonist, Thomas Blaine, waking in an operating room during the procedure to give him a new host body and thus a new life. He is then soon conscious and aware of the fact he is living in the year 2110, a result of his mind being transferred into a new host body and the procedure completed. He must then learn to live with his new circumstances, as his last living moments were in 1958 and an existential struggle ensues with the new world he now finds himself living in.

In film and television 
This story was first adapted as the opening episode for the third series of the BBC science-fiction anthology series Out of the Unknown, starring Derek Benfield as Tom Clarke (a renamed Thomas Blaine). The master videotape for the episode was later wiped by the corporation, and only brief video and audio clips are known to exist. The Beatles discuss watching it in the first part of The Beatles: Get Back.

The story was loosely adapted into the 1992 film Freejack.

A famous scene from the novel involving a character lost in a future New York City and mistakenly getting in line for a suicide booth was parodied in the pilot episode of Futurama.

References

External links
Official site of Robert Sheckley

Time Killer parts one, two, three, and four at the Internet Archive

1959 American novels
1959 science fiction novels
Novels by Robert Sheckley
Works originally published in Galaxy Science Fiction
Novels first published in serial form
American science fiction novels
American novels adapted into films